Krystian Brzozowski (born 20 February 1982 in Namysłów) is a male freestyle wrestler from Poland. He participated in men's freestyle 74 kg at 2008 Summer Olympics. He was eliminated in the 1/16 of final losing with Arsen Gitinov.

Brzozowski participated in M
men's freestyle 74 kg at 2004 Summer Olympics as well. He was ranked on 4th place.

He won two bronze medals at 2006 European Wrestling Championships and 2014 European Wrestling Championships.

External links
 Wrestler bio on beijing2008.com

1982 births
Living people
People from Namysłów
Olympic wrestlers of Poland
Wrestlers at the 2008 Summer Olympics
Wrestlers at the 2004 Summer Olympics
Sportspeople from Opole Voivodeship
Wrestlers at the 2015 European Games
European Games competitors for Poland
Polish male sport wrestlers
Universiade medalists in wrestling
Universiade silver medalists for Poland
European Wrestling Championships medalists
Medalists at the 2005 Summer Universiade
20th-century Polish people
21st-century Polish people